The 1933 Fordham Rams football team was an American football team that represented Fordham University as an independent during the 1933 college football season. In its first year under head coach Jim Crowley, Fordham compiled a 6–2 record, shut out four of eight opponents, and outscored all opponents by a total of 195 to 40.

Schedule

References

Fordham
Fordham Rams football seasons
Fordham Rams football